The 5th Grey Cup was played on November 29, 1913, before 2,100 fans at A.A.A. Grounds at Hamilton.

The Hamilton Tigers defeated the Toronto Parkdale Canoe Club 44–2.

Notable facts
 The 44–2 score stands as the second-largest margin of victory in a Grey Cup game.
 It was the final time Parkdale advanced to the Grey Cup.

External links
 
 

05
Grey Cup, 05th
Grey Cup
1913 in Ontario
November 1913 sports events
20th century in Hamilton, Ontario